Life Skills Center of Middletown is an alternative high school in Middletown, Ohio, United States, operated by LifeSkills' which operates schools in several U.S. states. Life Skills offers an online curriculum designed to help students earn a high school diploma. The school is designed to allow students to be employed full-time or do volunteer work while in high school.

References

High schools in Butler County, Ohio
Middletown, Ohio
Public high schools in Ohio
2002 establishments in Ohio